Stephen Quemper (born 12 May 1993) is a French professional footballer who plays as a left-back for Ligue 2 club Guingamp.

Career
A youth product of Guingamp and Morlaix, Quemper began his senior career with Concarneau. He spent his early career in the semi-pro French leagues with from 2015 to 2019, before transferring to SC Bastia. He made his professional debut with Bastia in a 1–1 Ligue 2 tie with Nancy on 11 August 2021.

On 10 January 2022, he returned to his first club Guingamp.

References

External links

Foot-National Profile

1993 births
Living people
People from Morlaix
Sportspeople from Finistère
French footballers
Footballers from Brittany
Association football fullbacks
En Avant Guingamp players
US Concarneau players
Stade Briochin players
SC Bastia players
Championnat National players
Championnat National 2 players
Championnat National 3 players